Wai o Taiki Bay is a suburb in Auckland, New Zealand. It is under the local governance of Auckland Council.

Location
Bordering Glen Innes, Glendowie and the Tamaki River estuary.

Demographics

Glen Innes East-Wai O Taiki Bay had a population of 3,447 at the 2018 New Zealand census, a decrease of 90 people (−2.5%) since the 2013 census, and a decrease of 408 people (−10.6%) since the 2006 census. There were 915 households, comprising 1,725 males and 1,719 females, giving a sex ratio of 1.0 males per female. The median age was 29.3 years (compared with 37.4 years nationally), with 900 people (26.1%) aged under 15 years, 858 (24.9%) aged 15 to 29, 1,434 (41.6%) aged 30 to 64, and 255 (7.4%) aged 65 or older.

Ethnicities were 39.7% European/Pākehā, 22.1% Māori, 46.0% Pacific peoples, 9.9% Asian, and 2.5% other ethnicities. People may identify with more than one ethnicity.

The percentage of people born overseas was 30.2, compared with 27.1% nationally.

Although some people chose not to answer the census's question about religious affiliation, 32.6% had no religion, 52.6% were Christian, 2.7% had Māori religious beliefs, 0.5% were Hindu, 1.6% were Muslim, 2.8% were Buddhist and 1.7% had other religions.

Of those at least 15 years old, 489 (19.2%) people had a bachelor's or higher degree, and 552 (21.7%) people had no formal qualifications. The median income was $22,500, compared with $31,800 nationally. 372 people (14.6%) earned over $70,000 compared to 17.2% nationally. The employment status of those at least 15 was that 1,125 (44.2%) people were employed full-time, 369 (14.5%) were part-time, and 189 (7.4%) were unemployed.

History 
Its name is based on the original name of the Tamaki River, Te Wai o Taiki, meaning "The Waters of Taiki". The name Taiki is a shortened form of Taikehu, the name of an ancestor of Ngāi Tai.
The suburb contains a mix of state houses and architecturally designed houses constructed by developers.

It was formerly under Auckland City Council from 1989 until the merger of all of Auckland's councils into the 'super city' in 2010.

Landmarks and features

Tahuna Torea
Tahuna Torea is a 25-hectare, wildlife reserve of mangrove lagoon and swampland sited on a long sandbank extending out into the Tamaki Estuary. Rich in Māori history as well as home to native birds and vegetation, Tahuna Torea means 'gathering place of the oystercatcher'. There are three main walking trails around the reserve.

Wai-O-Taiki Nature Reserve
Wai-O-Taiki Nature Reserve is a bushy reserve that runs along the Tamaki Estuary, with a track connecting it to the larger Tahuna Torea reserve.

Education

Notes

Suburbs of Auckland
Populated places on the Tāmaki River